Elis Holmer (1 December 1893 – 29 February 1968) was a Swedish diver. He competed in the men's plain high diving event at the 1912 Summer Olympics.

References

External links
 

1893 births
1968 deaths
Swedish male divers
Olympic divers of Sweden
Divers at the 1912 Summer Olympics
Divers from Gothenburg
19th-century Swedish people
20th-century Swedish people